Karol Kisel (born 15 March 1977) is Slovak football agent and retired footballer.

Club career
He previously played for Lokomotíva Košice, Ozeta Dukla Trenčín, Bohemians Praha, Sparta Prague and FC Slovan Liberec.

Sydney FC

In early 2009 he was linked with Australian A-League club Sydney FC for the 2009/10 season, where he would be reunited with former manager Vítězslav Lavička. On 3 April 2009, it was announced that Kisel had signed a one-year deal with the club.

He scored his first goal for the Sky Blues at home against the Brisbane Roar, which Sydney won 2–1. He scored his second goal in Sydney's 2–0 win over the Melbourne Victory to help claim the A-League Premiership.

Slavia Prague

Despite Sydney FC offering a new contract, Kisel declined the offer and returned to the Czech Republic to continue his law studies. In June 2010 he signed a 1-year contract with Slavia Prague. Kisel played as captain for the 2010–11 Gambrinus liga. Kisel played his final game with Slavia Prague in their 3–1 win over Bohemians 1905.

Return to Sydney FC

On 8 February 2011, Kisel re-signed with Sydney FC for the upcoming 2011-12 A-League Season. He was not eligible to play in the AFC Champions League due to Sydney FC's foreign spots being full. Kisel's last game for Sydney FC was the away Elimination final against Wellington Phoenix on 30 March 2012.

Return to Slavia Prague

On 22 May 2012, Slavia Prague announced Kisel's return for 2012–13 season. The transfer officially went through on 1 July 2012 when the Gambrinus Liga transfer window started. He once again assumed the role of team captain soon after his arrival. He scored his first goal on his return to the club, on the opening match day's 3–3 draw with Vysočina Jihlava. Kisel confirmed on 28 November 2013 that he would retire after Slavia's match against Liberec on Monday 1 December.

International career
Kisel had been in and out of the Slovakian national squad ever since he made his debut in 2002. He had also played several games for the Slovakian U-21 squad. He played several games in Slovakia's attempt to qualify for the 2006 FIFA World Cup in Germany and he scored his first goal in qualifying Slovakia's 4-0 thumping of Luxembourg.

International goal
Score and result list Slovakia's goal tally first.

Honours
With Sparta Prague:
 Gambrinus Liga: 2006–2007
 Czech Cup: 2005–2006, 2007–2008, 2007–2008

With Sydney FC
 A-League: Premiers 2009–10
 A-League: Champions 2009–10

References

External links
 Profile at iDNES.cz
 Sydney FC profile
 
 
 

1977 births
Living people
Sportspeople from Košice
Slovak footballers
Slovakia under-21 international footballers
Slovakia international footballers
FC Lokomotíva Košice players
AS Trenčín players
Bohemians 1905 players
AC Sparta Prague players
SK Slavia Prague players
FC Slovan Liberec players
Footballers at the 2000 Summer Olympics
Olympic footballers of Slovakia
Czech First League players
Sydney FC players
A-League Men players
Slovak expatriate footballers
Expatriate footballers in the Czech Republic
Expatriate soccer players in Australia
Slovak expatriate sportspeople in the Czech Republic
Slovak expatriate sportspeople in Australia
University of West Bohemia alumni
Association football midfielders